Steinsdalen or Osen is the administrative centre of the municipality of Osen in Trøndelag county, Norway.  The village lies in the valley called Steinsdalen.  The river Steinsdalselva runs through the valley and has its mouth near the village Osen Church is located in the village.

References

Osen
Villages in Trøndelag
Valleys of Trøndelag